The People's Party of the Canary Islands (PP) is the regional section of the People's Party of Spain (PP) in the Canary Islands. It was formed in 1989 from the re-foundation of the People's Alliance.

References

People's Party (Spain)
Political parties in the Canary Islands